Bahujanratna Loknayak is a Marathi daily broadsheet newspaper based in Thane, Maharashtra. It was founded by late Mr. Kundan Gote on 23 October 2005 and is currently owned by elder son Shubham Kundan Gote, and he's Editor-in-chief, Managing editor is younger son Buddhabhushan Kundan Gote.  The office of "Bahujanratna Loknayak" is situated at 207, S2, Kharton Road, Thane West, Maharashtra. The paper has eight editions from locations in Maharashtra, Thane, Mumbai, Nashik, Aurangabad, Pune, Raigad, Jalna and Akola.

See also 

 List of Marathi-language newspapers

References

External links 

 Loknayak website
 Bahujanratna Loknayaks English website
 Loknayak featured on Navayan

Marathi-language newspapers
Newspapers published in Maharashtra